Actinidia chrysantha is a species of plant in the Actinidiaceae family. It is endemic to China.

References

chrysantha
Endemic flora of China
Fruits originating in East Asia
Vulnerable plants
Taxonomy articles created by Polbot